Shoenberg may refer to:

 Isaac Shoenberg (1880–1963), Russian-born British electronic engineer. 
 David Shoenberg (1911–2004), British physicist and son of Isaac.

See also
 Schoenberg, a surname
 Schönberg (disambiguation)